Dichostates lobatus is a species of beetle in the family Cerambycidae. It was described by Karl Jordan in 1894.

Varieties
 Dichostates lobatus var. albomaculatus Breuning, 1942
 Dichostates lobatus var. fasciculatus Hintz, 1919
 Dichostates lobatus var. flavomaculatus Hintz, 1912
 Dichostates lobatus var. griseus Breuning, 1942
 Dichostates lobatus var. maculatus Hintz, 1919
 Dichostates lobatus var. ochraceomaculatus Breuning, 1942

References

Crossotini
Beetles described in 1894